Sapelli may refer to:

Sapele, an African tree
Jorge Sapelli, former Vice President of Uruguay
Camila Canabal Sapelli, Venezuelan TV-hostess